The Clique is a 2008 American teen comedy-drama film directed by Michael Lembeck from a screenplay by Liz Tigelaar, based on the young adult novel series of the same name by Lisi Harrison. The film was produced by Alloy Entertainment and Tyra Banks' company Bankable Productions, and was released on November 11, 2008.  It stars Elizabeth McLaughlin and Ellen Marlow, with Bridgit Mendler, Samantha Boscarino, and Sophie Anna Everhard in supporting roles.

Plot
12-year-old Massie Block is the leader of the Pretty Committee, a clique of popular, wealthy students at her upstate New York all-girls private school, Octavian County Day. Much to Massie's chagrin, the Block family begins hosting the Lyons family, old friends of Massie's father who have recently moved from Florida and have a daughter Massie's age, Claire. Massie is immediately put off by Claire’s off-brand clothes and social awkwardness, and orders the other members of her clique - Alicia Rivera, Dylan Marvil, and Kristen Gregory - to join her in bullying and excluding Claire.

While horseback riding, Massie meets a boy named Chris Abeley and is instantly smitten with him, later becoming jealous when she sees him talking to Claire. Meanwhile, Claire befriends Chris' eccentric younger sister Layne and eventually makes plans with her. She later ditches Layne to attend the Pretty Committee's weekend sleepover that she has been invited to by Massie's mother, though she eventually leaves due to the other girls' hostile treatment of her. The next morning, Claire and Layne make amends.

Claire visits Massie's room one night in an attempt to confront her, but Massie is gone. Seeking revenge, Claire logs onto Massie's computer and, pretending to be the latter, sends disparaging messages to Dylan, Alicia, and Kristen. The other three girls all angrily confront Massie the next day and invite Claire to take her place in their clique. Once they eventually realize the truth, they reconcile and continue conspiring against Claire. The girls tell Massie about an upcoming charity auction taking place on Chris' birthday, suggesting that she should jump out of a pop out cake and loudly profess her feelings for him, to which Massie happily agrees.

On a field trip to New York City, the Pretty Committee tries to sell a makeup line created by Kristen for a school project, but their recipe contains peanut oil, which triggers allergic reactions in their classmates. Amidst the panic, Massie anonymously texts Claire to use Layne's oatmeal snack to reduce the swelling, making Claire into a hero.

At the charity auction, Claire reaches out to the other members of the clique, who all accept her apology and commend her on her efforts to stand up to Massie, revealing that they all secretly harbor disdain for Massie's cruel and controlling nature as well. Claire then learns that Chris has a girlfriend and prevents Massie from jumping out of the cake to save her from embarrassment. After the auction, Massie thanks Claire and admits that she had been bullying her because she saw her as a threat. As Massie types on her computer that night, she decides that Claire is now "in" the Pretty Committee.

Cast 
 Ellen Marlow as Claire Lyons
 Elizabeth McLaughlin as Massie Block
 Bridgit Mendler as Kristen Gregory
 Samantha Boscarino as Alicia Rivera
 Sophie Anna Everhard as Dylan Marvil
 Vanessa Marano as Layne Abeley
 Keli Price as Chris Abeley
 Dylan Minnette as Todd Lyons
 Elizabeth Keifer as Judi Lyons
 David Chisum as William Block
 Julie Lauren as Kendra Block
 Boris McGiver as Isaac
 Angel Desai as Nurse Adele
 Elizabeth Gillies as Shelby Wexler
 Neal Matarazzo as Jay Lyons
 Camila Vignaud as Fawn

Production
Filming began in February 2008 in Rhode Island and ended in March 2008.

Reception
Common Sense Media gave the film three stars, praising the acting while calling it "materialistic".

Soundtrack

The accompanying soundtrack album was released on November 11, 2008, by Razor & Tie.

Track listing

Songs that are not included on the soundtrack album:
 "Heaven on Earth" by Free & Easy
 "My Own Band"	by Mellow Dee
 "What You Say" by Mellow Dee
 "Psycho 4 U" by CanDee Land
 "String Quartet No. 18" by Franz Schubert

References

External links
 
 
 

The Clique (series)
2008 films
2008 comedy-drama films
2008 direct-to-video films
2000s American films
2000s English-language films
2000s teen comedy-drama films
Alloy Entertainment films
American direct-to-video films
American teen comedy-drama films
Direct-to-video comedy-drama films
Films about teenagers
Films based on Canadian novels
Films based on young adult literature
Films directed by Michael Lembeck
Films scored by George S. Clinton
Films set in Manhattan
Films shot in Rhode Island
Warner Bros. direct-to-video films